Paracleros substrigata, Berger's dusky dart, is a butterfly in the family Hesperiidae. It is found in Ivory Coast, Ghana, Nigeria, Cameroon, Gabon, the Central African Republic, the Democratic Republic of the Congo and western Tanzania. The habitat consists of forests.

References

Butterflies described in 1893
Erionotini
Butterflies of Africa